The great xenops (Megaxenops parnaguae) is a furnariid bird, which is endemic to the Caatinga region of north-eastern Brazil. It is monotypic within the genus Megaxenops.

Its name refers to the superficial similarities to the "true" xenopses of the genus Xenops. Its bill is similarly up-curved, but with a total length of c. 16 cm (6 in), it is noticeably larger and overall bright cinnamon-rufous with a white throat. It is generally inconspicuous, typically foraging amongst foliage rather than on trunks.

References

 Great Xenops

great xenops
Birds of the Caatinga
Birds of Brazil
Endemic birds of Brazil
great xenops